The following is a list of soccer players who have made at least 300 domestic league appearances in Australian league soccer. This includes the appearances and goals of players in the A-League Men and National Soccer League.

Alex Tobin has made the most appearances, and is the only player to have played in over 500 games. John Markovski made appearances for 10 different clubs, while five players have made their appearances for only one team. Liam Reddy has currently made his appearances during a career spanning 23 seasons.

List of players

Note: Players in bold are still active players.

Key

Notes

See also
 List of soccer players in Australia by number of league goals

References

Lists of association football players
Association football league records and statistics